Pamela Mason (10 March 1916 – 29 June 1996), also known as Pamela Kellino, was an English actress, author, and screenwriter, known for being the creative partner and first wife of English actor James Mason.

Early life and personal life
Born Pamela Helen Ostrer in either Westgate-on-Sea, Kent or Southend-on-Sea, Essex, Mason was the daughter of Helen (née Spear-Morgan) and Isidore Ostrer, a wealthy Jewish industrialist and banker who became president of the Gaumont British Picture Corporation in the early 1920s. Pamela left school at age 9, and married cinematographer Roy Kellino at age 18 in 1934, thereafter taking the name "Pamela Kellino".

In 1935, Pamela Kellino met actor James Mason on the set of his second film, Troubled Waters, on which her husband was working as a cinematographer. James Mason and Pamela Kellino were quickly attracted to each other. Mason became close friends with both Kellinos, moved in with them, and collaborated with them on several stage and screen projects, culminating in the 1938 film I Met a Murderer, in which he and Pamela Kellino played lovers on the run. Shortly afterwards, Roy Kellino divorced Pamela, naming James Mason as co-respondent, and she married Mason in 1940. Roy Kellino remained on friendly terms with the Masons and directed their later films Lady Possessed and Charade. After her divorce and remarriage, Pamela Mason continued to use the name "Pamela Kellino" for some years in her acting and writing work.

The Masons moved from London to Hollywood in the late 1940s, occupying the mansion previously owned by Buster Keaton, where Pamela became a popular hostess of parties. They had two children: daughter Portland (1948–2004), and son Morgan (who later became an advisor to President Ronald Reagan and married Belinda Carlisle). Portland was named for the Masons' friend Portland Hoffa, the wife of the American radio comedian Fred Allen.

Pamela Mason filed suit for divorce from James in 1962, claiming that he had committed adultery. According to their son Morgan and other sources, Pamela herself had had numerous affairs, but due to her attorney Marvin Mitchelson's skill, she won a monetary settlement of at least $1 million ($9.275 million today) when the marriage was finally dissolved in 1964; it was reported as "America's first million-dollar divorce". As a result of this success, Mitchelson became a sought-after celebrity divorce attorney. Pamela Mason continued to live in the Keaton mansion in Beverly Hills until her death, sharing it “with a multitude of free-range cats.” She remained someone who was listened to and outspoken “with unrepentant, undeviating, withering aim.”

Film
Mason (as Pamela Kellino) made her film debut in 1934 in the Gaumont British big-budget film Jew Süss. She remained under contract to Gaumont British (her father's film company) for several years, despite acting in films only sporadically while also working as a screenwriter, producer, and author.

From the late 1930s through the 1950s, Pamela Mason (often credited as Pamela Kellino, including after her marriage to James Mason), wrote, produced and/or appeared in several films in collaboration with James Mason and/or Roy Kellino. Most notably, she co-starred with James Mason in the films The Upturned Glass and Charade (directed by Roy Kellino), both of which she also co-wrote. The Masons co-produced the films I Met a Murderer and Lady Possessed, both of which were directed by Roy Kellino and lost money. Pamela Mason also had small roles in a number of other films starring James Mason.

Later films in which she appeared without James Mason included The Child (1954) (a short film directed by James Mason, in which their daughter Portland also appeared), Sex Kittens Go to College (1960), Five Minutes to Live (1961) and The Sandpiper (1965).

Television
In the mid-1950s, the Masons appeared together on a short-lived variety show, The James Mason Show. Pamela Mason was a contestant on many episodes of  the TV quiz show You Bet Your Life, hosted by Groucho Marx. She changed her name, dialect, and style look every time she appeared on that show, except that her allure always captivated Groucho. In the 1960s, she hosted two talk shows: The Pamela Mason Show, from 1965 to 1966, and The Weaker (?) Sex, which featured female guests, from 1968 to 1969.

From the late 1950s through the 1970s, she made occasional appearances as a guest star on various TV series, including Playhouse 90, Love, American Style, and Wonder Woman.  Her last acting appearance was in a made-for-television biographical film of Errol Flynn in 1985.

Mason was a regular guest on The Merv Griffin Show in the 1960s and 1970s.

Stage
Before her marriage to James Mason and subsequent move to Hollywood, Pamela Mason (as Pamela Kellino) appeared in a number of London stage productions, including several that she co-financed, co-wrote or appeared in with James Mason. In 1947, she made her American stage debut in the title role of the Broadway show Bathsheba, in which James Mason co-starred as "David"; it closed after only 29 performances.

Writing
In addition to her screenwriting work, Mason authored a number of books, both fiction and non-fiction, some of which were published under the name "Pamela Kellino". Her novel Del Palma (1948), dismissed by Kirkus Reviews as "trash", became the basis for the film Lady Possessed, which the Masons co-produced.

Other titles by Mason include the novel Ignoramus, Ignoramus (1950) (illustrated by James Mason); The Cats in Our Lives (1949), about the cats and other animals owned by the Masons (co-written and illustrated by James Mason); Marriage Is the First Step Toward Divorce (1968); and The Female Pleasure Hunt (1972).

Business
Mason was the controlling stockholder of Illingworth, Morris, a textile firm previously controlled by her father and uncle. She also ran a mail-order vitamin company and managed property in Las Vegas, Nevada, and Los Angeles.

Death
On 29 June 1996, Mason died of heart failure at her home in Beverly Hills, California. She was survived by her daughter and her son. She is buried in Westwood Village Memorial Park Cemetery in Los Angeles.

Filmography

Radio appearances

References

External links
 
 
 
 

1916 births
1996 deaths
English film actresses
English television actresses
English expatriates in the United States
20th-century English actresses
20th-century English women writers
Actresses from Kent
People with acquired American citizenship
Burials at Westwood Village Memorial Park Cemetery
20th-century English screenwriters
James Mason family